Lucius Norbanus Balbus was a Roman senator during the Principate. He was consul in AD 19, as the colleague of Marcus Junius Silanus Torquatus. Balbus was the younger son of Gaius Norbanus Flaccus; his brother was the consul of AD 15, Gaius Norbanus Flaccus.

According to Ronald Syme, Balbus is known only from a single anecdote from Cassius Dio (LVII.18.3), yet in it he "comes to life." Dio describes Balbus as a keen trumpeter; at dawn on his first day as consul he began to play his trumpet, terrifying the populace who had believed the year to be announced with fateful omens.

Josephus mentions a Norbanus, a nobleman of great bodily strength, who was killed by the German bodyguards when Caligula was assassinated (Antiquities of the Jews, XVIII, 123). Edmund Groag argues he was Balbus; if so, then Balbus died in January 41. However Syme points out this Norbanus might be the son of Balbus or his older brother.

References 

Imperial Roman consuls
1st-century Romans
Norbani